Rebecca Sinclair (born 11 September 1991 in Auckland) is a halfpipe snowboarder based in Wanaka, New Zealand. She was the youngest New Zealand athlete to compete at the 2010 Winter Olympics (age 18) and finished 21st. Sinclair also competed at the 2014 Winter Olympics.
Sinclair's results over the last few years include:

2012/2013
2nd World Cup Finland,
4th World Cup Canada,
4th TTR World Snowboard Championships,
6th X Games Europe,
Snow Sports NZ "Snowboarder of the year"

2011/2012
4th FIS World Snowboard Championships,
6th US Open,
Snow Sports NZ "Snowboarder of the year"

2010/2011
2nd Junior World Snowboard Championships,
21st Winter Olympics Vancouver

Sponsorships
Sinclair has a sponsorship with Megaphone, Moonbars, and K2 Snowboards.

Video
There are videos on YouTube of Sinclair snowboarding.

References

1991 births
Living people
New Zealand female snowboarders
Olympic snowboarders of New Zealand
Snowboarders at the 2010 Winter Olympics
Snowboarders at the 2014 Winter Olympics